The following Confederate Army units and commanders fought in the Battle of Champion Hill of the American Civil War. The Union order of battle is listed separately. Order of battle compiled from the army organization, returns of casualties and reports.

Abbreviations used

Military rank
 LTG = Lieutenant General
 MG = Major General
 BG = Brigadier General
 Col = Colonel
 Ltc = Lieutenant Colonel
 Maj = Major
 Cpt = Captain
 Lt = 1st Lieutenant

Other
 w = wounded
 k = killed
 c = captured

Department of Mississippi and East Louisiana
LTG John C. Pemberton
Chief of Engineers: Maj Samuel H. Lockett

See also

 Mississippi in the American Civil War

Notes

References
U.S. War Department, The War of the Rebellion: a Compilation of the Official Records of the Union and Confederate Armies, U.S. Government Printing Office, 1880–1901.
 The Battle of Champion Hill website

American Civil War orders of battle